Caiyu Town is a town located in the east end of Daxing District, Beijing, China. It shares border with Majuqiao Town and Yujiawu Hui Ethnic Township to the north, Yongledian Town to the east, Wanzhuang Town and Langfang Economic Development Area to the south, and Changziying Town to the west. As of 2020, the population of Caiyu Town was 54,690.

According to Tianfu Guangji written during the Qing dynasty, the region had been called Caiweili in older times, and had been renamed Fanyushu in the early days of Ming dynasty. Later people started to combine the two names to form the name Caiyu.

History

Administrative divisions 
In 2021, 59 subdivisions constituted Caiyu Town, consisted of 3  residential communities, 55 villages, and 1 economic development area:

Gallery

See also 

 List of township-level divisions of Beijing

References 

Towns in Beijing
Daxing District